International Steel Group (ISG) was an American steel company, headquartered in Cleveland, Ohio, which was established by the New York investment firm WL Ross & Co LLC to acquire the assets of bankrupt steel companies and combine them together in a new company.

In 2004 it was ranked #426 on the Fortune 500 list.

History
International Steel Group was created in 2002, after the turn-around investment fund WL Ross & Co. LLC, purchased the LTV Steel (Ling-Temco-Vought) and Acme Steel corporations.

The next year, it acquired what was left of the remaining assets of the dissolved Bethlehem Steel, formerly America's second-largest steel producer, without merging.

In 2005, ISG was acquired by Mittal Steel, which merged with Arcelor to become ArcelorMittal in 2006.

The Luxembourg based ArcelorMittal is an integrated steel and mining multinational corporation, and is the world's largest steel producer .

Timeline
 2002: ISG purchased the assets of Acme Steel, and the integrated steel assets of LTV in February.
 2003: ISG acquired the Bethlehem Steel Corporation assets, and the Gary plate mill of U.S. Steel.
 2004: ISG purchased the assets of Weirton Steel, Georgetown Steel, and an HBI facility in Trinidad and Tobago.
 2005: Completed merger with Mittal Steel Company in April.
 2006: Mittal completed takeover of Arcelor, to form ArcelorMittal.

See also
 List of steel producers

References

External links
 Official archived International Steel Group website — Intlsteel.com, via the Internet Archive Wayback Machine.
 ArcelorMittal S.A. corporate website

Steel companies of the United States
Manufacturing companies based in Cleveland
American companies established in 2002
Manufacturing companies established in 2002
Manufacturing companies disestablished in 2005
2002 establishments in Ohio
2005 disestablishments in Ohio
Bethlehem Steel
ArcelorMittal
2005 mergers and acquisitions
Defunct manufacturing companies based in Ohio